The 2022 NCAA Division III Men's Ice Hockey Tournament was the culmination of the 2021–22 season, the 37th such tournament in NCAA history. Because of the Covid-19 Pandemic, it was the first tournament held since 2019. The top ranked team in the nation, Adrian, won the program's first national championship.

Qualifying teams
Twelve teams qualified for the tournament in the following ways: (Pool A) eight teams received bids as a result of being conference tournament champions from conferences that possessed an automatic bid, (Pool C) four additional teams received at-large bids based upon their records.

Format
The tournament featured four rounds of play. All rounds were Single-game elimination.

The top four rated teams received byes into the quarterfinal round and were arranged so that if they were to advance to the semifinals, the first seed would play the fourth seed and the second seed would play the third seed. Because two western teams received byes, the two eastern schools that were furthest west geographically, and did not receive byes, were placed in the same quarterfinal bracket and set to play against the eastern-most of the two western teams to receive byes. This was done so that the travel distance for the victor would be as short as possible. The remaining two western teams were placed in the same quarterfinal bracket as the other western quarterfinalist.

The remaining four eastern teams were arranged so that the highest-ranked first round team would play the lowest-ranked first round team with the winner advancing to play the lower eastern quarterfinalist. The higher-ranked of the two eastern quarterfinalists would play the winner of the final first round game. 

In the First Round and Quarterfinals the higher-seeded team served as host. Beginning with the semifinals, all games were held at the Herb Brooks Arena.

Tournament Bracket

Note: * denotes overtime period(s)

All-Tournament Team
G: Cameron Gray (Adrian)
D: Matthew Doran (Geneseo State)
D: Matt Eller (Adrian)
F: Dan Bosio (Geneseo State)
F: Trevor Coykendall (Adrian)
F: Sam Ruffin* (Adrian)
* Most Outstanding Player(s)

Record by conference

References

External links
2022 Division III Bracket

 
NCAA Division III ice hockey